St. Alban's Cathedral is an Anglican church in Kenora, Ontario.

It was the cathedral of the Diocese of Keewatin prior to its dissolution in 2015.

References

St Alban's Cathedral
20th-century Anglican church buildings in Canada
Anglican church buildings in Ontario